This is a list of the lists of islands in the world grouped by country, by continent, by body of water, and by other classifications. For rank-order lists, see the other lists of islands below.

Lists of islands by country

Africa

Antarctica

Asia

Europe

North America

Oceania

South America

Lists of islands by continent

Lists of islands by body of water

By ocean:

By other bodies of water:

List of ancient islands

Other lists of islands

External links 
 Island Superlatives